Pa Tappeh (also Romanized as Pā Tappeh) is a village in Cham Chamal Rural District, Bisotun District, Harsin County, Kermanshah Province, Iran. At the 2006 census, its population was 381, in 88 families.

References 

Populated places in Harsin County